Littoinen (Finnish; Littois in Swedish) is a village in south-western Finland, centred on Lake Littoinen. The village is shared between the town of Kaarina and the municipality of Lieto, and it borders the regional centre of Turku. It started growing after the founding of a broadcloth factory by Lake Littoinen in 1739, and the railway connection built in 1899 increased its growth. In the 1960s the operations of the broadcloth factory were discontinued due to decreased demand, but the premises still exist and have been transformed into residential and commercial spaces. The factory's heritage is still visible in the village's place and street names.

Kaarina
Lieto
Villages in Finland